Quimbaya (Kimbaya) is a supposed extinct language of Colombia, of which only a single word is known (Campbell 2012). This is insufficient to establish Quimbaya as a distinct language.

References

Choco languages
Languages of Colombia
Unclassified languages of South America